The Phylliroidae are a family of nudibranch sea snails, highly adapted to a pelagic lifestyle and occurring in tropical surface waters around the globe. The two species of the genus Phylliroe and Cephalopyge trematoides that have been assigned to this family are small to average in size (up to ), slender and highly transparent. They swim by undulating their whole body. Their foot is very small, which helps to reduce drag. They are carnivores that prey on planktonic jelly fish.

References

Further reading 
 
 Powell A. W. B., New Zealand Mollusca, William Collins Publishers Ltd, Auckland, New Zealand 1979 
 [WoRMS listing for this family]